Directive 98/84/EC of the European Parliament and of the Council of 20 November 1998 on the legal protection of services based on, or consisting of, conditional access is a European Union directive in the field of intellectual property law, made under the internal market provisions of the Treaty of Rome. The Directive covers "conditional access services", which are defined as television or radio broadcasts or internet services to which "access [...] in an intelligible form is made conditional upon prior individual authorisation" and payment. Examples are pay-per-view and encrypted television and internet sites which charge for access.

Member States may not restrict the provision of conditional access services which originate in another Member State [Art. 3(2)]. Devices intended to circumvent the access restrictions are prohibited (Art. 4).

The convention formed the basis for the Conditional Access Convention, a convention of the Council of Europe, to which the European Union is a party.

External links 
 Summaries of EU legislation > Internal market > Businesses in the internal market > Intellectual property > Directive 98/84/EC
 Directive 98/84/EC – text
 Directive 98/84/EC – national implementing measures
 Directive 98/84/EC – adoption procedure (proposal, preparative texts, amendments made by the institutions etc.)

See also 
 Copyright law of the European Union

Intellectual property law of the European Union
European Union directives
1998 in law
1998 in the European Union